Gary Graham (born 1950) is an American television actor.

Gary Graham may also refer to:

Shaka Sankofa (Gary Lee Graham, 1963–2000), executed in Texas for crimes committed at age 17
Gary Graham (musician) (born 1945), Canadian musician and educator
Gary Graham (fashion designer) (born 1969), American fashion designer and artist
Gary Graham (rugby union) (born 1992), Scottish rugby union player
Gary Graham (cricketer) (born 1982), Jamaican cricketer